The 1989 European Amateur Team Championship took place 28 June – 2 July at Royal Porthcawl Golf Club, Wales, United Kingdom. It was the 16th men's golf European Amateur Team Championship.

Venue 

The hosting club was founded in 1891. In 1895, the course, designed by Ramsey Hunter, was located close to Pink Bay Beach on the Glamorgan Coast between Cardiff and Swansea in Wales. It had previously hosted The Amateur Championship on five occasions, including in 1988.

On the first day of the tournament, there were strong winds and rain on the course, set up with par 72 over 6,643 yards.

Format 
Each team consisted of six players, playing two rounds of stroke-play over two days, counting the five best scores each day for each team.

The eight best teams formed flight A, in knock-out match-play over the next three days. The teams were seeded based on their positions after the stroke play. The first placed team were drawn to play the quarter final against the eight placed team, the second against the seventh, the third against the sixth and the fourth against the fifth. Teams were allowed to use six players during the team matches, selecting four of them in the two morning foursome games and five players in to the afternoon single games. Games all square at the 18th hole were declared halved, if the team match was already decided.

The eight teams placed 9–16 in the qualification stroke-play formed flight B and the four teams placed 17–20 formed flight C, to play similar knock-out play, to decide their final positions.

Teams 
20 nation teams contested the event. Each team consisted of six players.

Players in the leading teams

Other participating teams

Winners 
Team England won the opening 36-hole stroke-play qualifying competition, with a 37-over-per score of 757.

There was no official award for the lowest individual score, but individual leader was Russell Claydon, England, with a 1-under-par score of 143, five strokes ahead of nearest competitors.

Team England won the gold medal, earning their seventh title, beating team Scotland in the final 5–2.

Defending champions team Ireland earned the bronze on third place, after beating Sweden 5–2 in the bronze match.

Results 
Qualification round

Team standings

* Note: In the event of a tie the order was determined by the best total of the two non-counting scores of the two rounds.

Individual leaders

 Note: There was no official award for the lowest individual score.

Flight A

Bracket

Final games

Final standings

Sources:

See also 
 Eisenhower Trophy – biennial world amateur team golf championship for men organized by the International Golf Federation.
 European Ladies' Team Championship – European amateur team golf championship for women organised by the European Golf Association.

References

External links 
 European Golf Association: Full results

European Amateur Team Championship
Golf tournaments in Scotland
European Amateur Team Championship
European Amateur Team Championship
European Amateur Team Championship
European Amateur Team Championship